The KIIS-FM Jingle Ball (also referred to as just Jingle Ball) is an annual concert produced by the Los Angeles radio station KIIS-FM that takes place in early-to-mid December. Since 2000, the concert series has been staged at various venues around southern California, including the Shrine Auditorium and Staples Center in Los Angeles, and the Honda Center in Anaheim. 

iHeartMedia sister stations in other cities, such as WHYI in Miami, WXKS in Boston, KRBE in Houston, Texas, and WIOQ in Philadelphia, Pennsylvania, have also hosted Jingle Balls of their own  since 2011 as part of the iHeartRadio Jingle Ball Tour series.

History
The ″Jingle Ball″ concept and branding evolved from Top 40 radio station WHTZ (Z100)'s December 1994 ″Acoustic Christmas″ concert. The December concerts replaced WHTZ's annual ″birthday celebration″ summer concerts (1984–1993). The inaugural Z100 ″Jingle Ball″ concert was presented on December 5, 1996 at Madison Square Garden in New York City—it continues to be held at the venue since then.

List of concerts
Headlining acts are highlighted in bold where known.

2000
Held at Shrine Auditorium on December 16, 2000.

K-Ci & JoJo
Christina Aguilera
Third Eye Blind (with an appearance by Stevie Wonder)
Bon Jovi
Macy Gray
98 Degrees

2001
Held at Staples Center on December 19, 2001.
Alicia Keys
Shakira
Sugar Ray
LFO
Michelle Branch
Craig David
Toya

2002
Held at Honda Center on December 19, 2002.

Kylie Minogue
Mariah Carey
Destiny's Child
Justin Timberlake
Goo Goo Dolls
Avril Lavigne
Kelly Osbourne
Nick Carter
Paul Oakenfold

2003
Held at Staples Center on December 5, 2003.

Britney Spears
Beyoncé Knowles
Jessica Simpson
Sean Paul
Kelly Clarkson
Hilary Duff
Fabolous
Thalía
Simple Plan
Jennifer Lopez

2004
Held at Honda Center on December 3, 2004.

Avril Lavigne
Gwen Stefani
Ashlee Simpson
Snoop Dogg
Alicia Keys
Maroon 5 (acoustic performance)
Christina Milian
JoJo

2005
Held at Shrine Auditorium on December 6, 2005.

Shakira
Sean Paul
Frankie J
Chris Brown
Rihanna
The Pussycat Dolls

2006
Held at Honda Center on December 7, 2006.

RBD
Nelly Furtado with Timbaland and special guest Justin Timberlake
Bow Wow
Danity Kane
JoJo
Vanessa Hudgens

2007
Held at Honda Center on October 27, 2007.

Gwen Stefani
Timbaland with Keri Hilson and OneRepublic
Fabolous
Lloyd
Nicole Scherzinger
Sean Kingston

It was known as KIIS FM'S Homecoming instead of Jingle Ball because of Gwen Stefani coming back to her hometown.

2008
Held at Honda Center on December 6, 2008.

Jesse McCartney
Chris Brown (with a special appearance by Rihanna for a duet performance of "Umbrella")
Katy Perry
The Pussycat Dolls
Estelle
Tokio Hotel
Menudo
Akon
David Banner
Colby O'Donis
BoA

2009
Held at Nokia Theatre L.A. Live on December 5, 2009.

Taylor Swift
Keri Hilson
Fabolous
The Ting Tings
3OH!3
LMFAO
Jay Sean
Jason Derulo

2010
Held at Nokia Theatre L.A. Live on December 5, 2010.

Katy Perry
Enrique Iglesias
Flo Rida
B.o.B with special guest Hayley Williams
Travie McCoy
Taio Cruz
Paramore
Selena Gomez & The Scene
Bruno Mars
Far East Movement
Mike Posner

2011
Held at Nokia Theatre L.A. Live on December 3, 2011, headlined by Lady Gaga. Other performers included:

David Guetta
Flo Rida
Sean Paul
Gym Class Heroes
Taio Cruz
Nick Cannon
Big Time Rush
Karmin
Mindless Behavior

2012
Held at Nokia Theatre L.A. Live on December 1, 2012 and December 3, 2012.

December 1, 2012
Taylor Swift
Ne-Yo
Ellie Goulding
OneRepublic
Jonas Brothers
Sammy Adams
Will.i.am

December 3, 2012
Justin Bieber
Ke$ha
Flo Rida
The Wanted
Fun.
Afrojack
Owl City
Zedd
Psy

2013

Held at Staples Center on December 5, 2013.

Miley Cyrus
Macklemore & Ryan Lewis
Selena Gomez 
Enrique Iglesias
Paramore
Katy Perry
Ariana Grande 
Robin Thicke
Austin Mahone
Travie McCoy 
Fifth Harmony
Jason Derulo
Nicki Minaj
New Politics

2014
Held at Staples Center on December 5, 2014. Ed Sheeran made a surprise appearance and performed "Thinking Out Loud".

Taylor Swift 
5 Seconds of Summer
Ariana Grande (with appearances by Big Sean, The Weeknd, and Jessie J)
Sam Smith
Shawn Mendes
Pharrell Williams (with an appearance by Gwen Stefani)
Charli XCX
Meghan Trainor
Becky G
Nick Jonas (with an appearance by Demi Lovato)
Rita Ora
Iggy Azalea
Kiesza

2015
Held at Staples Center on December 4, 2015.

One Direction
Demi Lovato
Selena Gomez
5 Seconds of Summer
Shawn Mendes
Charlie Puth
Nicki Minaj
Nick Jonas
Zedd
Hailee Steinfeld
Ellie Goulding
Fifth Harmony
Calvin Harris
The Weeknd
DNCE
Tove Lo
Conrad Sewell

2016
Held at Staples Center on December 2, 2016.

Britney Spears
Backstreet Boys
Bruno Mars
Justin Bieber
Ariana Grande
Meghan Trainor
Ellie Goulding
Fifth Harmony
Shawn Mendes
Tove Lo
G-Eazy
Charlie Puth
DNCE
The Chainsmokers
Diplo
Hailee Steinfeld
Alessia Cara
Lukas Graham
Daya
Gnash
Niall Horan

2017
Held at The Forum on December 1, 2017.

Taylor Swift
Ed Sheeran
Camila Cabello
Liam Payne
The Chainsmokers
Sam Smith
Demi Lovato
Logic
Kesha
Niall Horan
Charlie Puth
Halsey
Macklemore
Lauren Jauregui
Cheat Codes
Sabrina Carpenter
Fall Out Boy
Emily Warren
Why Don't We

2018
Held at The Forum on November 30, 2018.

 Shawn Mendes
 Cardi B
 Calvin Harris
 Camila Cabello
 Khalid (with special guest Normani) 
 NF
 Dua Lipa
 G-Eazy
 Alessia Cara
 Bazzi
 Bebe Rexha
 Monsta X

2019
Held at The Forum on December 6, 2019. Rapper French Montana was part of the event's original lineup, but was eventually unable to attend after being hospitalized in November. He was replaced by One Direction member Louis Tomlinson.

 BTS (with an appearance by Halsey for "Boy with Luv")
 Billie Eilish 
 Katy Perry
 Halsey
 Normani
 Camila Cabello
 Louis Tomlinson
 Lizzo
 Sam Smith (with an appearance by Normani for "Dancing with a Stranger")

2020
In light of the COVID-19 pandemic, a virtual livestream of online performances was broadcast instead of an in-person concert, with some artists performing directly from their homes.
 The Weeknd
 Billie Eilish
 Doja Cat
 Dua Lipa
 Harry Styles
 Lewis Capaldi
 Sam Smith
 Shawn Mendes

2021 
Held at The Forum on December 3, 2021. Dua Lipa, who was originally announced as part of the event's lineup, eventually withdrew due to laryngitis.
 BTS
 Dixie D'Amelio
 Ed Sheeran
 Doja Cat
 Saweetie
 The Kid Laroi 
 Tate McRae
 Bazzi
 Lil Nas X (with an appearance by Doja Cat for "Scoop")
 Black Eyed Peas

2022 
Held at the Kia Forum on December 2, 2022. Pre-show performers for the outdoor Village stage were Armani White, Lil Huddy, Jax, and Jvke.

 Jax (with an appearance by Chelsea Lascher for "Victoria's Secret")
 Jvke
 Nicky Youre
 Ava Max
 Dove Cameron
 Lewis Capaldi
 Bebe Rexha
 Jack Harlow
 Khalid
 Pitbull
 Dua Lipa

See also
The Jingle Ball Tour 2014
iHeartRadio Jingle Ball Tour 2016

References

Annual events in California